Kerala Board of Public Examination is the state level education board of Kerala. It is administered by the Government of Kerala. The board is responsible for conducting various examinations on the basis of a unified law. Its headquarters are located at Pareeksha Bhavan, Poojapura, Thiruvananthapuram.

Affiliations
There are more than 12,644 schools affiliated to Kerala Board of Public examination out of which 4504 are government schools, 7277 are aided schools and 863 are unaided schools.

Structure 
The structure is divided into:
kindergarten (Lkg and UKG)
LP (lower primary, classes/standard 1–4)
UP (upper primary, classes/standard 5–7)
HS (High School, classes/standard 8–10)
Higher Secondary (+1 equals 11th class/standard and +2 equals 12th class/standard)

Usually, the whole system of KG, LP, UP and HS are collectively referred as High School. Students completing this complete course (12 years including KGs, which is optional* and otherwise 10 years of education) will be awarded with School Leaving Certificate, abbreviated as SSLC. Based on the results in SSLC, students are enrolled into Higher Secondary Education (HSE) which was previously known as pre-degree and was conducted in colleges. 

Now, HSE is integrated to the school system and most educational institutions now offer classes from LKG to +2. Higher secondary offers a wide range of subjects according to the candidate's preference. After completing +2, students are awarded with a HSE certificate given by the Board of Higher Secondary Education, Kerala under DHSE which is a passport to degree and similar courses.

Grading

SSLC 
The SSLC exam conducted at the end of Class 10 is based on a 9-point grading system ranging from A+ to E.

KBPE grading system

References

External links
Official website 
 Kerala Education Department Official Website
 DHSE Kerala Official Website

Education in Kerala
State agencies of Kerala
Kerala
1965 establishments in India
Educational institutions established in 1965